Abdel Moneim Madbouly (December 28, 1921 – July 9, 2006) was an Egyptian actor, comedian and playwright.

Biography 
Madbouly was born in Cairo and started acting at seven years old following the death of his father, as his family needed the money. Later on, he joined Fatma Rushdi's troupe of actors before joining the theatre of renowned Lebanese actor George Abyad.

Madbouly had an extensive career and is considered one of the greatest in the history of Egyptian and Arabic entertainment industry. He wrote, directed and acted in numerous plays, films and TV roles. His unique comedy style of depicting heartbroken old men was called Madboulism, and is much imitated by other performers from the middle east region. Adel Emam is probably the best known performer to use the Madboulism style.

Films
 In Al-Hawa Sawa: 1951
 My Mom and Me: 1957
 Me and My Heart: 1957
 Love Festival: 1958
 Between Heaven and Earth: 1959
 Heignonne: 1960
 Take Me With You: 1965
 Love for All: 1965
 Kill Me Please: 1965
 In Summer We Must Love: 1974

Death 
Abdel Moneim Madbouly died in Cairo in 2006 of congestive heart failure.

Resources

External links 
 

1921 births
2006 deaths
Egyptian male film actors
Egyptian comedians
Egyptian male television actors
Egyptian male stage actors
20th-century comedians